Ješovec ( or ) is a small settlement on the right bank of the Ložnica River in the Municipality of Slovenska Bistrica in northeastern Slovenia. The area is part of the traditional region of Styria. It is now included with the rest of the municipality in the Drava Statistical Region.

The local church is dedicated to the Three Kings and belongs to the Parish of Črešnjevec. It was built between 1639 and 1648.

References

External links
Ješovec at Geopedia

Populated places in the Municipality of Slovenska Bistrica